Giorgio Andreoli (between 1465 and 14701553), named also Mastro Giorgio Andreoli or Mastro Giorgio, was born in Intra, on Lake Maggiore, and died in Gubbio, where he spent most of his life, in 1555. He is considered to be one of the most important potters of the Italian Renaissance. He is famous as inventor of a particular kind of lusterware (lustro), using red and gold especially.

In 1498, he became a citizen of Gubbio and in 1518 invented his remarkable lustre, the chief characteristics of which are its beautiful gold and carmine colors. Good examples of his majolica may be found in the local museums of Gubbio, Urbino, Arezzo, and elsewhere in Italy, and also in the principal museums of decorative art in Europe, such as Berlin, Vienna, Paris, and South Kensington. 

Not all works fired with his lustre were designed by him, for potters of the neighboring cities brought their work to him to be fired. He was assisted in his work by his brothers Salimbene and Giovanni, and after his death it was continued by his son Vincenzo.

External links
Mastro Giorgio

References

15th-century births
1553 deaths
Italian artists
Italian potters
People from Intra